Doom Tree may refer to:

Doomtree, band
Hyphaene thebaica, tree (also known as doum palm and gingerbread tree).